André Lufwa Mawidi (15 November 1925 – 13 January 2020) was a Congolese sculptor. He is best known for his sculpture Batteur de tam-tam, which is on display at the Foire internationale de Kinshasa. Lufwa earned a degree in sculpture from École Saint-Luc in Kinshasa, which is now called Académie des Beaux-Arts.

References

1925 births
2020 deaths
Democratic Republic of the Congo sculptors
Male sculptors
20th-century sculptors
21st-century sculptors
21st-century Democratic Republic of the Congo people